Glaziers Bay is a rural locality in the local government area (LGA) of Huon Valley in the South-east LGA region of Tasmania. The 2016 census recorded a population of 93 for the state suburb of Glaziers Bay.

History 
Glaziers Bay is a confirmed locality. The name “Glazier” may be a corruption of “Glacier”, the surname of an early settler.

Geography
The western boundary follows the shoreline of The Huon River estuary.

Road infrastructure 
Route B68 (Channel Highway) passes to the north-east. Route C639 (Cygnet Coast Road) runs through from north-west to south-west.

References

Towns in Tasmania
Localities of Huon Valley Council